Francis William Sams Jr. (1846 – February 10, 1921) was a teenage soldier in the American Civil War, a cattle rancher and a state legislator in Florida. He served in the Florida Senate from 1899 to 1909. He was a Democrat.

There is a Sams Avenue in New Smyrna Beach.

References

Democratic Party Florida state senators
19th-century American politicians
20th-century American politicians
1846 births
1921 deaths
American cattlemen
People of Florida in the American Civil War